Dreams is the debut album by Evermore, released on 27 September 2004 in Australia, 8 October 2004 in New Zealand and 23 May 2006 in the US. The album peaked at No. 15 on the Australian ARIA Albums Chart, and received platinum accreditation in 2005. The album was nominated for four ARIA Music Awards in 2005. It reached No. 30 on the Official New Zealand Music Chart for albums.

The first single off the album was "It's Too Late", which was released on 2 August 2004, where it debuted at No. 38 on the ARIA Singles Chart, eventually reaching No. 15 in November 2004. The single was also the seventh-most played song in Australia in 2005. The second single "For One Day" was released on 14 February 2005, debuting on the ARIA Singles Chart at No. 20. The single was also nominated for Single of the Year at the ARIA Music Awards. A third single "Come to Nothing" was released on 23 May 2005.

In the 2004 Triple J Hottest 100, "It's Too Late" came in at No. 14 and "For One Day" at No. 57.

In 2005, "Into the Ocean (Calling You)" was adopted as the soundtrack theme for Ghost Hunt, a New Zealand paranormal television show. In 2006, a Dirty South remix of "It's Too Late" reached No. 1 on the Australian Club Charts and remained in the top 50 for 24 weeks.

Critical reception 

Dreams received generally favorable reviews from critics.

Track listing

Personnel
Jon Hume – vocals, guitars
Peter Hume – keyboards, piano, bass, vocals
Dann Hume – drums, percussion, vocals

Charts

Weekly charts

Year-end charts

Certifications

Release history

References

Evermore (band) albums
2004 debut albums
Albums produced by John Alagía